Carr is a hamlet in the civil parish of Laughton-en-le-Morthen, in the Rotherham district lying to the south of Rotherham, South Yorkshire, England.

See also
Listed buildings in Laughton en le Morthen

References 

Hamlets in South Yorkshire
Geography of the Metropolitan Borough of Rotherham